Yvonne Schaloske (23 August 1951 - 1 April 2020) was a Swedish actress. She was born in Borås. 

Yvonne Schaloske starred in many Swedish movies and in TV-shows, most notably the soap opera Rederiet.

Schaloske died in April, 2020, at the age of 68.

Selected filmography
 Det är långt till New York (1988)
 Night of the Orangutan (1992)

References

External links

1951 births
2020 deaths
Swedish film actresses
Swedish television actresses